Caloptilia issikii is a moth of the family Gracillariidae. It is known from China, Japan (the islands of Hokkaidō and Honshū) and the Russian Far East.

The wingspan is 10.8-11.5 mm.

The larvae feed on Alnus species, including Alnus japonica. They mine the leaves of their host plant.

References

issikii
Moths of Asia
Moths described in 1982